Summer Daydreams is the third album from American new-age pianist Kevin Kern. As with his preceding and succeeding albums, it is an album of instrumental songs. It was released on August 4, 1998.

According to Kern's bio in his official website, "Le Jardin" and "Return to Love" were used in the Korean Endless Love series Autumn in My Heart.

Track listing
All compositions by Kevin Kern.

"Le Jardin" – 4:51
"Once in the Long Ago" – 5:26
"Twilight's Embrace" – 7:00
"Water Tapestry" – 2:55
"Pan's Return" – 4:36
"Pastel Reflections" – 4:31
"Whisperings" – 5:02
"Summer Daydreams" – 5:18
"Dance of the Dragonfly" – 3:58
"Return to Love" – 4:23

Liner Notes
Music as luminous and intimate as a Monet painting has become the standard from pianist Kevin Kern, whose In the Enchanted Garden has become a cherished favorite in over 40 countries. Subtle colorings, including violins, cellos and clarinet, combine with gentle and eloquent piano songs to evoke a setting for Summer Daydreams.

Personnel
 Kevin Kern – Piano, Keyboards, Producer
 Jeremy Cohen – Violin
 Thalia Moore – Cello
 Luis Baez – Clarinet
 Bob Ward – French horn
 Terence Yallop – Executive Producer

References

External links
Kevin Kern's official website
Kevin Kern at Real Music

Summer Daydreams
Kevin Kern albums